Sar Samad (also Romanized as Sar Samād and Sar Şamad) is a village in Shamil Rural District, Takht District, Bandar Abbas County, Hormozgan Province, Iran. At the 2006 census, its population was 263, in 63 families.

References 

Populated places in Bandar Abbas County